Salim Kipkemboi (born 30 November 1998) is a Kenyan cyclist, who currently rides for UCI Continental team .

Kipkemboi joined  in 2017 and he won stage 3, the queen stage, of the 2018 Sharjah International Cycling Tour for his first career victory. He won the stage in a four-man sprint to the end.

Major results
2017 
 7th Overall Tour Meles Zenawi
2018 
 4th Overall Sharjah International Cycling Tour
1st  Young rider classification
1st Stage 3 
 10th Overall La Tropicale Amissa Bongo

References

External links

Kenyan male cyclists
1998 births
Living people
Cyclists at the 2018 Commonwealth Games
Commonwealth Games competitors for Kenya